Smile Again (lit. Smile, Dong-hae) is a 2010 South Korean daily  television drama, starring Ji Chang-wook, Do Ji-won, Oh Ji-eun, Park Jung-ah and Lee Jang-woo. It aired on Korean Broadcasting System's premier channel KBS1 from October 4, 2010 to May 13, 2011 on Mondays to Fridays at 20:25 for 159 episodes.

Plot

Prologue
Over 40 years ago, the Cho family lost their daughter (Cho Dong-baek) in a severe storm and almost drowned. Although Dong-baek survived, she suffered brain damage, erasing her past memories and left with the mental capacity of a nine year old. Despite the tragic circumstances, she was adopted by an American family and renamed her Anna Laker. Even though she has intellectual limitations, she can function almost normally like an adult. As a young adult, she fell in love with a Korean man, who used the English name James (aka Kim Joon), while he was studying abroad in New York. Due to personal circumstances, James had to leave Anna, but he asked Anna to wait for him and he'll find her. James did return to find Anna, but by then, she relocated and couldn't find her whereabouts; he returned to Korea.

A year or two later, James encountered Hong Hye-sook (adopted daughter of the Cho Family), a woman that deeply loved James and didn't want to let him go. She pressured James to stay with her and the two got married and had a son together, Kim Do-jin. Unknown to James, Anna was pregnant and gave birth to their son, Carl Laker (aka Dong-hae). Anna would spend the next 27 years, waiting for James while being a single mother to Carl. Their past, present, and future would all change when the Laker family decided to head to Seoul.

Main Story
Carl/Dong-hae visits Korea with his mother to participate in the short track speed skating competition as a representative on the American team. His trip to Korea is not just for the competition, but also to see his girlfriend, Sae-hwa, whom he dated for 6 years and promised to marry. However, Sae-hwa had a change of heart. Sae-hwa tells Dong-hae that she cannot be with him as long as he is with Anna. Later, he saves Sae-hwa from being struck by a truck in a traffic accident. The accident injured Dong-hae and ended his skating career. Meanwhile, Anna sees Dong-hae's father by chance and doesn't want to leave Korea. Dong-hae decides to stay in Korea and search for his father. He decides to find him and ask him the reason why he left them. In the midst of all of this is Bong-yi, an aspiring chef who wants to be the first female head chef. Bong-yi and her family take Dong-hae and his mother Anna in and treat them as family. However, the Lakers will be challenged in their quest for truth and happiness.

Sae-hwa had caught the attention of Do-jin and the two began to date. Although James has been loyal to his wife, his thoughts was always with Anna, causing him to be a distant father to Do-jin. Because of how Do-jin grew up, he doesn't want to date someone who had a relationship before, having an unusual logic that a woman with an ex-boyfriend would unfaithfully think about their former partner rather than their current one. Sae-hwa wanted to marry into the Kim Family and lied about being an inexperienced girl that was too busy studying to date anyone. The lie worked at first, but Dong-hae ended up working for the Camellia Hotel, where his half-brother works. Fearing that Dong-hae might mess things up, Sae-hwa always worried that Dong-hae might do something to ruin her plans. Sae-hwa ultimately married Do-jin and the couple was happy for a time, but Sae-hwa's constant fear of her past coming out lead to James learning the truth between Dong-hae's and Sae-hwa's past relationship in New York. Eventually, Do-jin also discovered the truth as well, leading him to distrust Sae-hwa and Dong-hae. Although the two have never rekindled their romance, Do-jin is constantly convinced that Dong-hae is after his wife and Sae-hwa is somehow suspiciously disloyal to him. The real romance was blossoming between Dong-hae and Bong-yi as they secretly dated each other behind their family's backs.  Things would only get complicated when Sae-hwa learned the truth of Dong-hae's true identity.

Learning of Dong-hae's paternity to James, she did her best to make sure the Lakers didn't get too close to the Kim Family to avoid discovery. However, Anna ended up working at the Camellia hotel as well and James' wife (unknowing of their relationship to James) took care of the Lakers for a time. Through Sae-hwa's own fumble, people in her family started to learn about Dong-hae's true identity and they conspired to help Sae-hwa to mutually protect their interests. When James finally found Anna, he couldn't help but investigate into her life and the Lees. Despite Sae-hwa's meddling and pressuring Anna to not reveal Dong-hae, James finally realized Dong-hae is his lost son. Because of the complications of reuniting as father and son, James kept his identity a secret to Dong-hae, but use his excuse as an executive to spend time with him. Eventually though, Hye-sook and Do-jin would learn about Anna and Dong-hae.

With the secret exposed, Dong-hae had difficulty accepting James as his father. Although Anna tried to explain that James never knew about him, Dong-hae had trouble welcoming a father that was never there for them. Feeling guilty and responsible for his actions, James wanted to divorce Hye-sook, leaving his family, and take care of his lost family. Unfortunately, it was met with great resistance. Do-jin refused to admit Dong-hae as his brother and made every effort to make his life difficult. Hye-sook would blackmail James, warning him that if he leaves the family, she'll use everything in her power to make the Lakers suffer for it. The Lees at the time were financially tied to the Camellia Hotel in their kimchi business, Hye-sook intends to hurt anyone that ever cared for the Lakers in retaliation, forcing James to stay put. When Anna realized that Hye-sook's husband was her beloved James, she was devastated and realized she can't destroy a family. Hye-sook would confront Anna, asking her to leave their family alone and offered them money and plane tickets to return to America so the Kim Family would be at peace. However, Dong-hae didn't want to submit to their pressure. While James offered to run away to America with the Lakers, but the Lakers themselves decided to leave the city to avoid hurting the Lees and bow to the demands of the Kims. However, Bong-yi was devastated that Dong-hae left without saying a word. He left a letter, explaining his reasons for leaving, but he promised this isn't a goodbye; he intends to return and wants her to wait for him.

Several weeks have passed and the Lakers initially found peace in a new neighborhood. Hye-sook and Do-jin kept a vigilant eye for the Lakers if they ever returned. Lee Pil-jae (a cop and Bong-yi's uncle) was in love with Anna and tried to search for them. Eventually, through his police connections, he did find Anna. Dong-hae was a budding celebrity chef and secretly worked at a friend's restaurant to help make ends meet. During this whole time, both Do-jin and Hye-sook grew cold and weary of Sae-hwa; they both wanted her out of their lives and insisted on a divorce. Not willing to give up on Do-jin, she summoned the Chos back into the hotel, causing blackmail and pressure to prevent herself from getting divorced. Mal-sun, Anna's mother, previously tasked Hye-sook to search for her missing daughter. However, she lied and secretly buried the investigation. Because she was loved by the Chos and devoted 30 years of her life into the Camellia Hotel, she always felt she rightfully deserve ownership of the hotel. If Anna would to come back, Mr. Cho would never transfer his majority shares to Hye-sook and she'll only be an executive for the rest of her life.

Mr. Cho returned to review the status of his hotel while Mrs. Cho used that time to resume searching for their missing daughter. Mr. Cho discovered the Kim Family was fragmented due to James' past relationship with Anna and tried to pressure him to stay with Hye-sook. Sae-hwa managed to figure out that Anna and Dong-hae are related to the Chos and did everything in her power to use this information as a bargaining chip to keep her within the Kim Family. Unfortunately, the secret was exposed and she lost all bargaining power. Sae-hwa eventually grew tired of trying to win back Do-jin and she granted him the signed divorce papers. However, Sae-hwa would later found out she's pregnant with Do-jin's child. Because James felt responsible for what happened to his daughter-in-law, he made the effort to look after her and she repaid his kindness by occasionally tipping him off about the devious machinations of his wife and son.

During Dong-hae's and Bong-yi's wedding, Do-jin called for an emergency stockholders' meeting to talk about the future management of the hotel. Dong-yi secretly discovered a calculation mistake in the hotel's finances and tipped off the authorities of tax fraud. This discovery was costly and Mr. Cho couldn't save the hotel unless he liquidated his shares into the market. Amassing his own support group, Do-jin amassed enough stocks to make Hye-sook the new majority shareholder of Camellia Hotel. News of this was a major shock to Mr. Cho and he fell into a coma. Dong-hae's wedding was ruined with the sudden collapse of his grandfather. With Hye-sook as the majority holder, she can now secure her power as the chairman of the hotel. However, the Lees, Chos, and Lakers wouldn't take this defeat so easily.

During the power struggle, the Camellia invested in a major hotel project in Hainan-China, but the funds went missing. Do-jin moved money out of the project and caused instability within the hotel's investments. Dong-hae began investigating into the matter and the key to solving it was Do-jin's lawyer. After the takeover, the lawyer vanished and Dong-hae tasked Pil-jae to help track him down. In between, Do-jin lost his support from his own mother. Hye-sook has been feeling very guilty about what she put her adopted father through. To atone for her sins, she decided to support Dong-hae as CEO of Camellia instead of Do-jin. Beyond Do-jin's imagination, Hye-sook gave away her shares to Dong-hae, restoring him as the majority shareholder of Camellia. Do-jin's lawyer provided all the necessary evidence to prove Do-jin guilty for embezzlement. With evidence against him in the Hainan project and loss of his shares due to his own mother, Do-jin ran off in disgrace. However, it would be James uniting the family.

James had an accident a while back and he's suffering from a brain aneurysm, slowly killing him. With all that has happened, he wanted to finalize things and see his family in case he wouldn't make it. Although Dong-hae pleaded with his father to take emergency surgery, James was waiting on Do-jin. Dong-hae tracked down and the two confronted each other in a fight and later sat down for an honest chat about their father and Sae-hwa's pregnancy. After learning that their father is dying and Sae-hwa with child, Do-jin finally let go of his grudge against Dong-hae, reconciled with Sae-hwa, and saw his James before he operated. The final matter was James' decision between Anna and Hye-sook. Even though Hye-sook realized she pressured James into marriage and he his thoughts was always about Anna, James realized he needed Hye-sook more than Anna. In doing so, James restored his marriage to Hye-sook. With James out of the competition, Pil-jae is able to be with Anna without further emotional confusion. Everyone finally made peace with each other.

Epilogue
A year has passed now and everyone is doing well. Dong-hae has become an accomplished manager in Camellia and Bong-yi as become an accomplished chef. Do-jin paid for his crimes and returned to society, where he finally get to reunited with Sae-hwa and meet his son. Joo-yeon (Sae-hwa's little sister) became a successful model while her husband finally passed the bar and became a judge. With everything right in the world, Dong-hae re-proposed Bong-yi (after the health scare with his grandfather) and the two successfully carried out their marriage without a hitch this time. Dong-hae can smile again.

Cast
 Ji Chang-wook as Carl Laker / Dong-hae
 Do Ji-won as Anna Laker / Jo Dong-baek

Lee family
 Im Chae-moo as Lee Kang-jae
 Lee Bo-hee as Gye Sun-ok
 Alex Chu as Lee Tae-hoon
 Oh Ji-eun as Lee Bong-yi 
 Kim Yu-seok as Lee Pil-jae
 Lee Joon-ha as Lee Song-yi, Pil-jae's daughter

Kim family
 Kang Seok-woo as Kim Joon
 Jung Ae-ri as Hong Hye-sook
 Lee Jang-woo as Kim Do-jin

Yoon family
 Park Hae-mi as Byun Sool-nyeo
 Park Jung-ah as Yoon Sae-hwa 
 Lee Joo-yeon as Yoon Sae-young

Extended cast
 Kim Sung-won as Jo Pil-yong, Anna's birth father
 Jung Young-sook as Kim Mal-sun, Anna's birth mother
 Choi Yoon-so as Baek Yoo-jin
 Lee Jung-ho as Lee Dae-sam
 Jung Eun-woo as Kim Sun-woo
 Kim Jin-soo as Bang Ki-nam
 Kim Yoon-hee as Jung Soon-hye
 Kang Chul-sung as home shopping PD
 Kim Yoon-tae as home shopping PD
 Kim Sung-hoon as policeman
 Seo Hye-jin as nurse
 Ham Jin-sung as staff
 Shin Dong-yup as hotel restaurant kitchen assistant (cameo)
 Yoon Jong-shin as hotel restaurant kitchen assistant (cameo)
 Min Joon-hyun
 Jung Soo-in

Awards
 2011 KBS Drama Awards
 Excellence Award, Actor in a Daily Drama: Ji Chang-wook
 Excellence Award, Actress in a Daily Drama: Do Ji-won
 Best Supporting Actress: Park Jung-ah
 Best New Actor: Lee Jang-woo

International broadcast
 It aired in Vietnam on TodayTV VTC7 from July 28, 2011 - November 2, 2011

References

External links
 Smile Again official KBS website 
 Smile Again at KBS World
 

Korean Broadcasting System television dramas
2010 South Korean television series debuts
2011 South Korean television series endings
Korean-language television shows
South Korean romance television series